Keith Sintay  is an American animator. Sintay has been an animation artist at Walt Disney Studios, DreamWorks Feature Animation, Sony Pictures Imageworks, and Digital Domain as well as many other studios.

Biography
Keith Sintay was born on February 22 in Southfield, Michigan, and currently lives in the Los Angeles area.

Sintay was inspired to become and animator after seeing The Rescuers in 1977. He grew up in Michigan, where he attended art school and practiced his drawing. He was accepted into the Disney internship program and was hired shortly after to work on Pocahontas. Sintay has worked on the films Hunchback of Notre Dame, Mulan, and Tarzan at Disney Feature, and Spirit, Sinbad and Sharktale at DreamWorks. At Sony Pictures Imageworks, Keith was Sr. Animator on Open Season, Monster House, Beowulf and I am Legend. Currently, he is working at Digital Domain on Transformers 2.

In addition to his work as an animator, Sintay is a contributing artist and illustrator for several books by author Mark Simon. Included in these are Facial Expressions and Storyboards, Motion in Art.

Filmography

References

External links
 
 Keith Sintay showreel 
 Keith Sintay Beowulf interview
 Beowulf interview pt. 2
 Place to learn character animation through mentorship

Living people
American animators
Central Michigan University alumni
Year of birth missing (living people)